Hans Næss may refer to:

 Hans Næss (sailor) (1886–1958), Norwegian Olympic sailor
 Hans Næss (architect) (1723–1795), Danish architect